Magma: Volcanic Disaster is a 2006 disaster film by Sci Fi Pictures.  Written by Rebecca Rian and directed by Ian Gilmour, the film stars Xander Berkeley and Amy Jo Johnson. It was filmed in Bulgaria.

Plot

The Trollsvotin volcano in Iceland violently erupts and kills a USGS survey team. Volcanologist professor Dr. Peter Shepherd takes four of his graduate students to study Grímsvötn, a dormant volcano. It also erupts suddenly, but the group is able to escape. While escaping by helicopter, Brianna witnesses Grímsvötn producing pyroclastic surges, an unusual amount of ash, and extremely runny lava. Meanwhile, Shepherd visits Dr. Oscar Vallian, a wheelchair-using volcanologist who recently quit working for the USGS. He explains his story about many dormant volcanoes, and he had formulated a theory known as Exodus, in which all of the Earth's volcanoes could erupt within a short period of time. Vallian leaves for Honshu, Japan, to be on the front lines when Mount Fuji erupts.

Shepherd travels to Washington, D.C., to explain the Exodus theory. Dr. William Kincaid, the head of the USGS, has a conflict of interest with O'Neil and Shepherd and is tasked to review their data. He promises the President's representative, Stephen Daugherty, to disprove the theory. Shepherd returns to his students to explain that the government will not act unless they get proof.

Natalie, a Park Ranger, arrives at work at Yellowstone National Park to be told that Old Faithful hasn't done anything for the last day. In Honshū, Vallian and his companion, Melanie, wait for Fuji's expected eruption. Shepherd plans with his students to go to South America to check out another volcano. That night, Shepherd calls his estranged wife. The next day, Fuji erupts, destroying much of the island of Honshu and triggering large tsunamis. Vallian calls Shepherd to bid farewell before a pyroclastic surge kills him and Melanie. Shepherd spends the night in a bar, mourning his friend. His student Brianna offers comfort and advice while listening to him explain how his marriage ended.

In the morning, news explains that Mount Kilimanjaro has erupted, so the group heads to Pasto, Colombia to do some investigating in a mine. The miners' leader halts the group with a gun, and Peter tells of the group's presence and asks what is going on. He then explains why the mine is closed, saying that some men were working earlier until liquid fire poured from the earth, causing havoc, killing some miners, and resulting in the mine's inactivity. Exploring the mine, they do not realize that they had unknowingly moved from the mine's shafts into attached lava tubes. Students Jacques and CJ take samples while Shepherd and Brianna head back. Sudden tremors result in Jacques and CJ falling. Magma falls from the ceiling as it collapses, and lava spills into the tunnel, killing Jacques, severely injuring CJ, and blocking the entrance to the mine. The others survive, but the magma, which has some iron from the Earth's core mixed in with it, has given CJ severe burns, which will require a skin graft.

The news reports that Mount Vesuvius and Mount Etna have erupted and destroyed most of Italy. Kai tells Dr. Shepherd that the samples from the mine were of the same composition as iron, which is why it looks similar to molten iron and why it moves at speeds normal lava cannot usually reach, and someone from the USGS had hacked into their server. Kincaid admits to hacking and stealing the data and plans to present the findings to Washington as his own. During his presentation to the President and Daugherty, Shepherd and his group interrupt and explain that they have additional evidence that Kincaid had not managed to steal. Dr. Shepherd explains to the President the full Exodus theory. Predicting that the Earth will head into another Ice Age within two weeks, Dr. Shepherd explains his solution that the Earth's pressure is controlled under the ocean rather than letting the Earth choose. He plans to use nuclear warheads at strategic points within oceanic faults.

After the meeting, Shepherd calls his ex-wife again and demands that she leaves Yellowstone National Park as Yellowstone is also becoming more volcanically active as the Old Faithful geyser has given previous signs earlier. Still, she doubts Peter's warning as she states Yellowstone has not had a violent eruption in years though a supervolcano can erupt at any time regardless of its condition. While he's on the phone, Daugherty calls to let him know that the President has approved their plan and they now have all of the resources of the CIA at their disposal to map the ocean and figure out the plan. With the coordinates set, Daugherty lets Shepherd know that he and one of the students will work hand in hand with the naval fleets from two of its flagships, the Hyperion and the Reprisal. Brianna is left at the USGS as the go-between.

Shepherd boards the Hyperion, in the Pacific Rim, by jumping from a helicopter and diving down to the sub. Kai boards the Reprisal in the Atlantic. Shepherd shows the Hyperion captain where the explosions must go in the middle of the Mariana Trench. In the morning, Natalie starts packing up her campground while another Ranger and some scientists examine Old Faithful. Kai contacts Brianna to confirm the coordinates for his sub, which will also be passed on to Russian and British submarines.

Meanwhile, the Hyperion gets bounced around by volcanic activity in the trench, which pummels them with debris. Natalie arrives at the next set of campgrounds, only to find an eruption already taking place, and she flees. The Hyperion suffers heavy damage but is able to reach its coordinates and launch the warheads. It fires its first round of torpedoes, but one goes off track and hits the trench wall. Two more are fired and hit successfully.

At the same time, the Reprisal has also fired its first four torpedoes. However, it takes heavy damage from the resulting debris. Shepherd loses contact with Kai while the Hyperion continues to strike its remaining targets. Natalie tries to flee Yellowstone as geysers start spewing molten magma, killing multiple park visitors. The President explains that the Earth, for the past few weeks, has been experiencing a series of violent volcanic eruptions and that a total of forty-four nuclear-tipped torpedoes are being fired to try and heal the Earth. As Shepherd prays for his wife, the lava flow at Yellowstone stops just before reaching Natalie and a large group of visitors. The Reprisal sinks, killing its crew and Kai. With the last of the torpedoes fired, the plan succeeds, and the Hyperion is able to stabilize. The volcanoes of the world return to normal. Shepherd turns down a position as head of the USGS and reconciles with his wife.

Cast
 Xander Berkeley as Dr. Peter Shepherd
 Amy Jo Johnson as Brianna Chapman
 David O'Donnell as C.J.
 George R. Sheffey as Dr. William Kincaid
 Michael Durrell as President Fletcher
 Reiko Aylesworth as Natalie Shepherd
 Vlado Mihailov as Kai Senakoia
 Rushi Vidinliev as Jacques
 Valentin Ganev as Oskar Valenteen
 Asen Blatechki as Holloway
 Scott Owens as Harvey "Harv"
 Jonas Talkington as Stephen Daugherty
 Ryan Spike Dauner as O'Neil 
 Dessi Morales as Melanie

Critical reception 
Scott Weinberg of DVD Talk wrote that the film "is as pre-fabricated and ultra-conventional as you could ever imagine", he found the dialogue unbelievable, the direction poor, the plot to be unimaginative, and the effects to be "kistchy at best, hilariously inept otherwise."  He summarized by writing "If you rent these flicks for the goofiness, this one's worthy of a rental."  David Johnson of DVD Verdict found the special effects to be unconvincing, noting that "any time there's lava onscreen, the film stumbles."   He poked fun at the "talkiness of the plot", but found the acting to be "decent enough to make the cataclysm sound halfway believable". Opining that as he might have been able to find the film acceptable otherwise, "a batch of putrid CGI would find its way onto the screen, and the taste soured."  Ben Rhudy of Monsters and Critics found the pacing to be slow and the film to be cliché, offering that the film "is yet another prime example of a promising premise marred by a cable TV budget."  He noted the DVD release included an awful theatrical trailer that "surpasses the film it represents in both pacing and excitement."

References

External links 

 
 

2006 television films
2006 films
American disaster films
Films shot in Bulgaria
Films about volcanoes
Syfy original films
2006 drama films
2000s English-language films
2000s American films
Films set in the Yellowstone National Park